Stalag 383 was a German World War II Prisoner of War camp located in Hohenfels, Bavaria.

History
The German Army founded a training area near Hohenfels, Bavaria in 1938. A troop camp for trainees, located in a high valley surrounded by dense woodland and hills at a homestead called 'Polnrich', was commandeered for use as a Prisoner of War camp in 1939. At first it was used for Allied NCOs and named Oflag IIIC but was later renamed Stalag 383 as it expanded with other ranks. The camp comprised 400 detached accommodation huts,  x , each typically housing 14 men. More were built towards the end of the war as prisoners were moved in from other camps as the Russian front advanced from the east. The name, Oflag III-C, was re-assigned to a camp at Lübben (Spreewald) and operated between August 1940 and June 1942.
On April 24, 1945, Major General Stanley Eric Reinhart's 65th Infantry Division captured Hohenfels. Major General Gustav Geiger, staff and guards surrendered. The prisoners, including many British and Colonial inmates, were liberated.

Later, between 1945-1949 the site became a displaced persons camp. The Americans subsequently retained the site and it doubled in size.

Notable people
 

Percy Sekine (1920–2010), RAF pilot and prisoner in 1942

See also
List of German World War II POW camps

References

Further reading

External links

 Stalag 383 - The Wartime Memories Project
 Personal account by Bill Clark, POW at Stalag 383
 Stalag 383 - The Pegasus Archive

World War II prisoner of war camps in Germany